Constantin Herold (4 February 1912 – 28 August 1984) was a Romanian multi-sport athlete that practiced through his career 14 sports. He was mostly known for his activity in basketball, where he was a player and coach. On 17 June 2005, he received post-mortem the Honorary Citizen of Moreni title.

Early life
Constantin Herold was born in Moreni from a family of six children. He had an attraction for sport while being a pre-school child, playing football at the  M.A.T.I.L.U.S. sports association. At the age of 10, he won a children athletics competition in Moreni, being first at all five disciplines (shot put, long jump, high jump, sprint run and long-distance running). Later he moved in Ploiești at the "Saints Peter and Pavel" High School where he continued exercising athletics and football, also starting to participate at gymnastics disciplines. In 1926 he moved to Brașov, where he attended the Ioan Meșotă and Andrei Șaguna High Schools and   where he continued to develop his multi-sport abilities, winning school inter-class decathlon competitions. In 1931, he became a student at the National University of Physical Education and Sport (ANEFS).

Basketball career
Constantin Herold played his first basketball game in 1934 for his college team ANEFS at the first ever National University Championship in a 4–27 loss against the University of Law School Bucharest team.

Later he played for Telefon Club București who in 1950 merged with CFR București, forming Locomotiva PTT București, where Herold was a player-coach, managing to win the 1951 Romanian League title. He also played 24 games for the national team, including appearances at EuroBasket 1947 where the team finished on the 10th position with Herold having a 6.6 average points per game scored. In 1952 he transferred to new founded club CCA București where he played until 1953 after which he retired from playing and became the team's coach.

He coached CCA București from 1954 until 1968, winning 10 Romanian League titles (7 consecutive) and reaching the semi-finals of the 1960–61 FIBA European Champions Cup. He worked through the years with players like Andrei Folbert, Mihai Nedef, Liviu Naghy, Emil Niculescu, Alexandru Fodor, Florin Burada, Armand Novacek, Mihai Erdogh, Mihai Dimancea, Ioan Testiban, Theodor Nedelea, Ion Cimpoiaș and Valeriu Gheorghe, who nicknamed him "Uncle", the press nicknamed the team "The uncle and his nephews" or "The golden CCA".

Herold coached the national team at EuroBasket 1959 (8th place) and EuroBasket 1961 (7th place).

Multi-sports activity
During his years as a student at ANEFS, Constantin Herold got a job as a sports instructor at Telefon Club București, where together with other colleagues from the firm he founded the volleyball, basketball and handball teams of the club.

Herold played football as a goalkeeper at junior level alongside Iuliu Bodola at  B.M.T.E. Brașov. He made his debut in an official match for the senior team at the age of 15 in a 2–1 loss against Colțea Brașov. He later played for Astra Brașov as a midfielder and forward, continuing his career at Telefon Club București, helping them promote from the lower leagues of Romanian football to the second division, being the team's top-goalscorer during the process. He retired from football in 1937.

In his first year as student at ANEFS he broke the national junior records in the 110 metres hurdles, triple jump and pole vault disciplines at the National University Championships from Timișoara. In 1933 he became national champion at 110 metres hurdles, a performance repeated in 1934, when he also won the national decathlon title, establishing national records that would last until 1948. He retired from athletics after he represented Romania at the 1937 Balkan Championship at 110 metres hurdles, where he finished second.

Constantin Herold played handball in 11 for the national team, being part of Romania's squad at the 1937 World Cup from Magdeburg, Germany.

In 1946, he won as player, captain and coach of Romania's national volleyball team the Balkan Championship, played in Bucharest. He played volleyball until the age of 43 at I.C.F.S.

In 1954, Constantin Herold received the title of "emeritus master of sports" for his multi-sport activity and in 1966 he received the title of "emeritus coach" for teaching and forming generations of players. Constantin Herold practiced and competed in a total of 14 sports disciplines:
Athletics – school, junior, university and national champion in several events, national junior record breaker (110 metres hurdles, pole, triple jump), national champion in seniors (110 metres hurdles in 1933 and 1934), national decathlon champion (1934), record holder for 14 years in decathlon, member of the national team
Football – player at B.M.T.E. Brașov, Astra Brașov and Telefon Club București (from the establishment of the club until it reached the second division)
Handball in 11 – member of the national team and participant at the 1937 World Cup from Germany
Volleyball – player and captain of the national team
Basketball – player and captain of the national team
Shooting sports – the third place at the national rifle championships, with the performance of 391 points out of 400 possible
Alpine skiing – champion in the military patrol competition
Rowing – participant in the city championships of Bucharest as part of the Telefon Club București team
Water polo – goalkeeper at Telefon Club București in the city championship
Table tennis – trade union champion of the Capital in the mixed doubles event from 1946, together with Mariana Bunescu
Tennis – played in the second category championship and qualifiers of Bucharest for the C.C.A. and Justice team
Rugby – player at Telefon Club București
Fencing – university champion of Bucharest at foil and sabre in 1934
Gymnastics – member of the model team of ANEFS at the demonstrations from the student camp organized on the occasion of the 1936 Summer Olympics in Berlin.

References

1912 births
1984 deaths
People from Moreni
Andrei Șaguna National College (Brașov) alumni
Romanian men's basketball players
Romanian basketball coaches
Romanian footballers
Liga II players
Romanian men's volleyball players
Romanian volleyball coaches
Romanian male handball players
Romanian male hurdlers
Romanian male sport shooters
Romanian male rowers
Romanian male water polo players
Romanian male table tennis players
Romanian male tennis players
Romanian rugby union players
Romanian male alpine skiers
Romanian male foil fencers
Romanian male sabre fencers
Romanian male artistic gymnasts
Romanian decathletes
Association footballers not categorized by position